The High Court of Kerala is the highest court in the Indian state of Kerala and the Union territory of Lakshadweep. It is located in Kochi. Drawing its powers under Article 226 of the Constitution of India, the High Court has the power to issue directions, orders and writs including the writs of habeas corpus, mandamus, prohibition, quo warranto and certiorari for ensuring the enforcement of the Fundamental Rights guaranteed by the Constitution to citizens or for other specified purposes. The High Court is empowered with original, appellate and revisional jurisdiction in civil as well as criminal matters, and the power to answer references to it under some statutes. The High Court has the superintendence and visitorial jurisdiction over all courts and tribunals of inferior jurisdiction covered under its territorial jurisdiction.

At present, the sanctioned Judge strength of the High Court of Kerala is 35 Permanent Judges including the Chief Justice and 12 Additional Judges. Depending on the importance and nature of the question to be adjudicated, the judges sit as Single (one judge), Division (two judges), Full (three judges) or such other benches of larger strengths.

The foundation stone for the new multi-storied building now housing the High Court of Kerala was laid on 14 March 1994 by the then Chief Justice of India, Justice M. N. Venkatachaliah. The estimated cost of construction was 100 million Indian rupees. The construction was completed in 2005 at a cost of 850 million Indian rupees. The completed High Court building was inaugurated by the Chief Justice of India, Justice Y. K. Sabharwal on 11 February 2006. The new High Court building is equipped with modern amenities like videoconferencing, air conditioned courtrooms, internet, and facilities for retrieval of order copies and publishing of the case status via the internet. The building has in it a post office, bank, medical clinic, library, canteens and such other most needed utilities and services. The High Court of Kerala has moved to its new building from the date of its inauguration, from the adjacent palace, where it had been functioning.

History of judicial system in the State of Kerala 

The present State of Kerala is result of integrating the erstwhile princely kingdoms of Travancore and Cochin with Malabar district and Kasaragod. The present judicial system in Kerala has its roots dating back to the days of the monarchs of the Kingdoms of Travancore and Cochin.

Early Reforms in the Kingdom of Travancore
In 1799, the Kingdom of Travancore became a vassal state of the British Empire. British diplomats encouraged judicial reform as they became involved in the political affairs of Travancore.

In 1811, following the 1808 insurrection against British Cochin and Quilon, Colonel H. M. Munro succeeded Colonel Macaulay as the Resident in Travancore with supervision over the Kingdom of Cochin. Following an investigation into the rampant lawlessness and the abuse of the system, Colonel Munro surveyed the region with his assistant Captain Blacker and established reforms including courts, pensions, and construction of roads, bridges and schools. He functioned as the Diwan until February 1818 when he handed over the reins to Nanjappayya of Coimbatore. Thus it was Colonel Munro who laid the foundations for a systematic legal system, resulting in the present day scenario. Until his time, there were no independent tribunals for the administration of justice.

Judicial system in the Kingdom of Travancore 
In the Kingdom of Travancore, Munro recommended necessary regulations to be passed for the reorganisation of the Courts. These recommendations were accepted by the then king and a Regulation in tune to his recommendations was passed in 1811. Zilla Courts and a Huzur Court were established in the Kingdom of Travancore, in the years 1811 and 1814 respectively. Munro established five zilla (District) courts in A.D 1811 at Padmanabhapuram, Thiruvananthapuram, Mavelikkara, Vaikom and Aluva. Huzur Court, which functioned as the final appellate Court was later replaced by Sadar Court in 1861. Sadar Court, which possessed almost all the powers of the present High Court of Kerala, continued functioning until 1881. Later in 1887, the High Court of Travancore was established with bench strength of five judges. One among the five judges was appointed as the Chief Justice. The judges had the assistance of a Pundit, who acted as an amicus curiae to advise them on the various points of Hindu law. Ramachandra Iyer was appointed as the first Chief Justice.

Judicial system in the Kingdom of Cochin 
In the Kingdom of Cochin, Desavazhis and Naduvazhis were empowered to settle the disputes following the prevailing customary law. More serious matters used to be attended by the monarch himself. In 1812, for the first time in its history, graded law courts were established under the Diwanship of Colonel Munro, in the Kingdom of Cochin. The first Subordinate Courts (Sub Courts) were established by Colonel Munro at Trichur (Thrissur) and Tripunithura. Until 1835, Huzur Court was the final appellate Court. Huzur Court had a bench strength of three judges. Later the Huzur Court was reconstituted as Rajah's Court of Appeal and Subordinate Courts were reconstituted as Zilla Courts. The Zilla Courts were empowered with unlimited jurisdiction, but subject to the confirmation from the Rajah's Court of Appeal. The Rajah's Court of Appeal was reconstituted as the Chief Court of Cochin in 1900. The Chief Court of Cochin had three permanent judges one of whom acted as the Chief Judge. Mr. S. Locke was appointed as the first Chief Judge. Later the Chief Court of Cochin was reconstituted as the High Court, during the Diwanship of Sri. Shanmukham Chettiyar.

After the integration of Travancore and Cochin kingdoms 
After India gained her independence on 15 August 1947, the Kingdoms of Travancore and Cochin were integrated to form the Travancore-Cochin State or Thiru-Kochi on 1 July 1949. Later, the High Court of Travancore-Cochin was established at Ernakulam on 7 July 1949 under the Travancore-Cochin High Court Act (1949). Mr. Puthupally Krishna Pillai was the last Chief Justice of High Court of Travancore-Cochin.

Establishment of High Court of Kerala 
On 1 November 1956, the States Reorganisation Act, 1956 was passed thereby integrating the State of Travancore-Cochin with Malabar district and Kasaragod to form the present State of Kerala. The High Court of Kerala, as it is today was established on 1 November 1956 as the High Court designated for the State of Kerala. The Kerala High Court Act, 1958 defined the jurisdiction and various functions, and powers of the High Court of Kerala. Initially, many cases from both the Travancore-Cochin High Court and the High Court of Madras were transferred to the High Court of Kerala for adjudication. Justice K. T. Koshi was appointed as the first Chief Justice of High Court of Kerala.

Justice's 
The current sitting judges of the court are as follows:

Former Chief Justices

Controversy
The High Court of Kerala building in Kochi had not assigned Number 13 to any of its courtrooms due to triskaidekaphobia. This created a controversy in Kerala as the state prides itself on being the most literate in India. A petitioner questioned this in Kerala High Court itself whether it was due to superstitious beliefs, as the room numbering skipped from 12 to 14. Later, the Supreme Court of India over-ruled the High Court's decision admonishing the encouragement of superstitions saying that "The High Court is an institution. It should not be allowed to encourage this sort of superstitions"

Kerala Legislative Assembly passed resolution for setting up a high court bench at Thiruvananthapuram, capital city of Kerala. The Union Government and the Supreme Court are favourable in sanctioning more high court benches in country, and had already sanctioned many in other states. However, a new high court bench at Thiruvananthapuram is still pending, due to opposition by some in the high court at Ernakulam. The opposition is based on the rationale that when the United State of Travancore-Cochin (the forerunner to the State of Kerala) was created, it was agreed that its capital would be Travancore's capital Thiruvananthapuram, where the legislature and the executive would be based, but that the judiciary would be based in Kochi, Cochin's capital.

See also 
 High Courts of India
 KHCAA Golden Jubilee Chamber Complex

References

External links 

 High Court of Kerala
 History of present judiciary in Kerala
 Speech at the inauguration of the new building 

 
Law enforcement in Kerala
1956 establishments in Kerala
Courts and tribunals established in 1956